The action of 23 March 23 1654 was a naval battle which took place near Colombo, Ceylon, when a force of 5 Portuguese galleons which were escorting 5 merchant galliots to Colombo, fought its way through a Dutch blockading squadron of 3 ships. 2 of the Dutch ships were captured, but the Portuguese in the confusion of having their 2 top officers killed, these ships were recaptured. They ran aground but were refloated.

Ships involved

Portugal
Nazaré 42 (flag, António Pereira)
São João 38 (second flag, Álvaro de Novais)
Santo António de Mazagão 36 (António Sottomaior)
São José 34 (Francisco Machado Deca)
São Filipe e Santiago 24 (António de Abreu)

Netherlands
Windhond (flag?)
Renoçer (Rhinoceros) (second flag?)
Drommedaris (yacht)

Renoçer and probably Windhond were the captured ships.

1654
Action of 1654-03-23
Naval battles involving Portugal
1654 in Asia
Conflicts in 1654
1654 in the Dutch Empire
1654 in the Portuguese Empire
Naval battles involving the Dutch Republic